Tashi Lhunpo Monastery, founded in 1447 by the 1st Dalai Lama, is the traditional 
monastic seat of the Panchen Lama, and an historically and culturally important monastery in Shigatse, the second-largest city in Tibet.

The monastery was sacked when the Gorkha Kingdom invaded Tibet and captured Shigatse in 1791 before a combined Tibetan and Chinese army drove them back as far as the outskirts of Kathmandu, when they were forced to agree to keep the peace in the future, pay tribute every five years, and return what they had looted from Tashi Lhunpo.

The monastery is the traditional seat of successive Panchen Lamas, the second highest ranking tulku lineage in the Gelug tradition of Tibetan Buddhism. The "Tashi" or Panchen Lama had temporal power over three small districts, though not over the town of Shigatse itself, which was administered by a dzongpön (prefect) appointed from Lhasa.

Located on a hill in the center of the city, the full name in Tibetan of the monastery means "all fortune and happiness gathered here" or "heap of glory". Captain Samuel Turner, a British officer with the East India Company who visited the monastery in the late 18th century, described it in the following terms:

Pilgrims circumambulate the monastery on the lingkhor (sacred path) outside the walls.

Although two-thirds of the buildings were destroyed during the Chinese Cultural Revolution, they were mainly the residences for the 4,000 monks and the monastery itself was not as extensively damaged as most other religious structures in Tibet, for it was the seat of the Panchen Lama who remained in Chinese-controlled territory.

However, during 1966 Red Guards led a crowd to break statues, burn scriptures and open the stupas containing the relics of the 5th to 9th Panchen Lamas, and throw them in the river. Some remains, though, were saved by locals, and in 1985, Choekyi Gyaltsen, 10th Panchen Lama, began the construction of a new stupa to house them and honour his predecessors. It was finally consecrated on 22 January 1989, just six days before he died aged fifty-one at Tashi Lhunpo. "It was as if he was saying now he could rest."

History

The monastery was founded in 1447 CE by Gedun Drub, the disciple of the famous Buddhist philosopher Je Tsongkhapa and later named the First Dalai Lama. The construction was financed by donations from local nobles.

Later Lobsang Chökyi Gyalsten, the Fourth Panchen Lama and the first Panchen Lama to be recognized as such by the rulers of Mongolia, made major expansions to the monastery. Since then, all Panchen Lamas have resided at Tashi Lhunpo, and have managed to expand it gradually.

The 11th Panchen Lama Choekyi Gyalpo, recognized by the Chinese government through the traditional way, was enthroned under Chinese supervision at the monastery in November/December 1995.

Bronze Buddha statue
The tallest and largest bronze Buddha statue in the world is in Tashi Lhunpo Monastery. It is the Jampa Buddha statue. Jampa Buddha in Tibetan Buddhism is the Maitreya Buddha in Chinese Buddhism. It is the Buddha in charge of the future. This Buddha statue is 26.2 meters high.  Squatting on the 3.5-meter-high lotus seat, he overlooks the entire monastery. The Buddha statue is decorated with more than 1,400 precious ornaments such as pearls, diamonds and corals. According to records, the Buddha statue was cast by 110 craftsmen in 4 years.

Branch monasteries

One of its branch monasteries was the famous Drongtse Monastery, 14 km north of Tsechen.

Tashi Lhunpo Monastery in India 
In 1972, the monastery was re-established in Bylakuppe, India by the Tibetan population in exile.

See also 

 Panchen Lama
 Sera Monastery

References

Citations

Sources 
 Chapman, Spencer F. (1940). Lhasa: The Holy City. Readers Union Ltd., London.
 Das, Sarat Chandra. Lhasa and Central Tibet. (1802). Reprint: Mehra Offset Press, Delhi (1988).
 Das, Sarat Chandra. Lhasa and Central Tibet. (1902). Edited by W. W. Rockhill. Reprint: Mehra Offset Press, Delhi (1988), pp. 40, 43 ff., 69, 114, 117, 149, 237; illustration opposite p. 50.
 Dorje, Gyurme. (1999) Tibet handbook: with Bhutan, 2nd Edition. Footprint Travel Guides. , .
 Dowman, Keith. 1988. The Power-places of Central Tibet: The Pilgrim's Guide. Routledge & Kegan Paul, London and New York. 
 Richardson, Hugh E. Tibet & its History. Second Edition, Revised and Updated. (1984). Shambhala Publications, Boston Mass. .
 Sun, Shuyun (2008). A Year in Tibet. HarperCollins Publishers, London. .

External links

 Website of the Tashi Lhunpo Monastery in Bylakuppe
 Life on the Tibetan Plateau Tashi Lhunpo Monastery
 Le Tibet par la G219: bouddhisme, monastères et temples tibétains Photos made in 2012 (text in French).
 Grand Monastery of Tashi-Lhunpo 1902, Perry–Castañeda Library Map Collection, University of Texas, Austin
 Tashi Lhunpo Monastery UK Trust, a charity based in Salisbury, set up in 2003 to support the work of the monastery in exile

1447 establishments in Asia
Buddhist monasteries in Tibet
Buddhist temples in Tibet
Gelug monasteries
Major National Historical and Cultural Sites in Tibet
Shigatse
Tibetan Buddhist monasteries and temples in India